Melkite Greek Catholic Eparchy of Newton (in Latin: Eparchia Neotoniensis Graecorum Melkitarum) is an ecclesiastical territory of the Melkite Greek Catholic Church, a Byzantine rite Eastern Church within the Catholic Church. The eparchy is named for Newton, Massachusetts, and encompasses the entire United States.  There are, however, currently about fifty Melkite parishes, missions, and "outreaches," in about two dozen states.

History

Early immigration
The first large wave of Melkite immigration from the Middle East to the United States took place in the late 19th century, and the first American Melkite Catholic church was established in the 1890s.  Because there was no diocesan structure for Melkite Catholic faithful in the United States at the time, Melkite parishes were individually under the jurisdiction of the local Latin Church diocesan bishop.

Apostolic exarchate
As the Melkite Catholic presence in the United States reached 70 years, to serve the faithful the Holy See erected an apostolic exarchate on January 10, 1966, with the title Apostolic Exarchate of United States of America, Faithful of the Oriental Rite (Melkite).<ref>vatican.va, AAS 58 (1966), n. 8, S. 563f.</ref>  Archmandrite Justin Najmy (1898–1968), pastor of St. Basil the Great Church then in Central Falls, Rhode Island, (the parish is now in Lincoln, Rhode Island), was appointed as the first Exarch by Pope Paul VI on January 27, 1966.

After Bishop Najmy's death in 1968, Archbishop Joseph Tawil, the Patriarchal Vicar of Damascus, was appointed Najmy's successor in October 1969, in a procedure the Patriarch described as a compromise.

Eparchy
On June 28, 1976, the Exarchate was elevated to the status of an eparchy.vatican.va with the title Eparchy of Newton, and Archbishop Tawil became the first Eparch.

Later immigration
While the descendants of the earlier waves of Melkite immigrants to the U.S. became increasingly assimilated into American culture, the late twentieth and early twenty-first centuries saw, for a variety of reasons (e.g., economic, sectarian), new waves of Melkite immigrants hailing from traditional Middle-eastern homelands.  Additionally, within the U.S., many older generations of Melkites began to retire and moving to Sun Belt states.  These two phenomena help account for the growth of new Melkite missions and "outreaches."  In some well established Melkite parishes new waves of immigrants saw a resurgence in Arabic, over English, as the primary liturgical language.

Structure

The seat of the Eparchy is Our Lady of the Annunciation Cathedral in the West Roxbury section of Boston. The main offices of the eparchial curia (e.g, protosyncellus, chancellor) are located adjacent to the cathedral.

The Eparchy is named for the Boston suburb of Newton, where its offices and the bishop's residence had been located until Bishop John Elya sold to private developers two of the three major eparchial properties in the Boston area. In 2015, Pope Francis designated Saint Anne Church in Los Angeles as a co-cathedral.  It is often home to Bishop Samra for several months of the year as he visits the Melkite churches in the western portion of the United States.

The eparchy has jurisdiction over all the Melkite faithful in the United States, and there are parishes, missions, "outreaches," and the like, in twenty-one states, none outside of the continental U.S.  Most Melkite communities are concentrated in a handful of states or geographic regions (e.g., California, New England, Michigan, Ohio, Greater New York City metropolis).  While the eparchy lists the number of parishes as 43, the additional missions and "outreaches" bring the total of Melkite communities in the U.S. to almost 50, each varying in size and level of vitality.

According to a research study published in Sociology of Religion, there were approximately 120,000 Melkites residing in the country in 1986, although only about 24,000 were formally enrolled in Melkite parishes.  In 2013 there were 24,000 Melkite Catholics in 43 parishes.  The United States Conference of Catholic Bishops reports that, as of 2018, there were 21,691 registered Melkites in the U.S., ranking it among the smallest 25% of Eastern Catholic groups.  
As of August 29, 2022, Bishop Nicholas Samra stated that there are about 36,000 registered Melkites with over 100,000 more of whom we do not know.  The number of active Melkites is considered to be significantly lower, as it the case with most other religious groups, especially highly-ethnic denominations.Hartford Institute for Religion Research  The discrepancy between a large number of canonical Melkites in the U.S. and the relatively small number of Melkite parishes, as well as decreasing numbers of attendees in many of those parishes, suggest to some that Melkites are assimilating into other denominations or, perhaps, not affiliating at all.  In fact, anecdotal evidence suggests that many Melkites whose first language is English become members of their local Roman Catholic parish.  Some Lebanese and Lebanese-American Melkites have migrated to the Maronites. Other Melkites whose first language is Arabic migrate to Greek Orthodox and Antiochian churches.  A few others, especially in larger metropolitan areas such as Los Angeles, assimilate into Arabic-speaking Mainline Protestant or Evangelical denominations.  Many, especially younger, Melkites are "Nones".

Seminary programs
In 1975, Archbishop Tawil founded a seminary program for the eparchy, after the Basilian Salvatorian Fathers -- a religious order separate from the eparchy with a superior of their own and who had originally been charged with the formation of Melkite eparchial clergy -- closed their program in Methuen, Massachusetts. Salvatorian students subsequently enrolled at Weston School of Theology, then in Cambridge, Massachusetts.  Eparchial students matriculated at Holy Cross Greek Orthodox School of Theology in Brookline, Massachusetts and received supplemental instruction from eparchial clergy. Both Weston and Holy Cross were members of the Boston Theological Institute, as it was known then.

In 1976, the eparchy purchased a house in Newton Centre, Massachusetts as a residence and house of studies for its seminarians, and named it St. Gregory Seminary. Eventually, Bishop John Elya sold the complex—along with the former chancery offices and bishop's residence in West Newton—to a private developer, at which time the chancery and bishop's residence relocated to an area adjacent to the cathedral.

Following ancient Christian tradition the eparchy counts among its clergy both celibate and married priests and deacons.

Most celibate eparchial clergy study at the Byzantine Catholic Seminary of SS. Cyril and Methodius in Pittsburgh.  Most of the married clergy study at various other Catholic schools of theology prior to their presbyteral ordinations.

Other Offices and Functions

The vocation office is co-located with the Melkite mission in San Antonio, Texas

The Judicial vicar/Tribunal is co-located with St. Ignatios Church in Augusta, Georgia.

The Economos is co-located with St. Ann Church in Woodland Park, New Jersey.

Office of Educational Services provides "catechetical materials and training programs for the parishes of the eparchy."  It is, in essence, run from the Melkite community in Sacramento, California.

Sophia Press publishes liturgical and prayer books, as well as biographies, histories, and other texts of Melkite interest.

OES Publications publishes booklets for sacramental preparation and spiritual development.Sophia is the quarterly magazine of the eparchy.

The office of the eparchial Victim Assistance Coordinator (VAC) is expected to be established in 2022.

There is a periodic national convention generally hosted by a Melkite parish, the last one held in July 2022 in Rancho Mirage, CA, the first hosted by no parish.  Other eparchial groups (e.g., NAMY, see below) often hold national gatherings shortly before the national convention.  There is also an annual clergy conference, the last two cancelled during the COVID pandemic.

Lay organizations
Bishop Ignatius Ghattas founded the Order of Saint Nicholas in 1991, a regional lay order attached to the Melkite Greek Catholic Eparchy of Newton.  This program is a revitalization during Bishop Samra's tenure.

Melkite Ambassadors is an organization for those in their mid-20s to aged 40.  It is for those "who want to participate in advocacy, catechesis mentorship, community life, community service, leadership development, and prayer."

Melkite Association of Young Adults (MAYA) is social and spiritual group for those who are aged 18 and at least one year out of high school to their mid-20s.  This group is active at the local parish level and nationally when conventions are held.

National Association of Melkite Women (NAMW) is open to any female aged 17 and older.  This group supports Melkite seminarians and vocations.

National Association of Melkite Youth (NAMY) is a "religious, social, educational, humanitarian" group for Melkite youth aged 13 to 18.

Society of Publicans is a fellowship of Melkite faithful united in daily prayer.

 Bishops 

Ordinaries
 Bishop Justin Abraham Najmy (January 27, 1966–June 11, 1968); Exarch
 Archbishop Joseph Tawil (October 30, 1969–December 2, 1989); Exarch until June 1976; then Eparch
 Bishop Ignatius Ghattas (February 23, 1990–October 11, 1992)
 Bishop John Elya (November 25, 1993–June 22, 2004)
 Archbishop Cyril Salim Bustros (June 22, 2004–June 15, 2011)
 Bishop Nicholas James Samra (appointed Auxiliary Bishop April 21, 1989; retired 2005; appointed Eparch June 15, 2011 - October 19, 2022)
 Bishop Francois Beyrouti (October 19, 2022 - present; elected June 23, 2022, by the Melkite Synod and announced August 20, 2022 Patriarch Joseph Absi).; episcopal consecration 12 October 2022, St Anne Melkite Greek-Catholic Co-Cathedral North Hollywood, LA)

Bishop Najmy through Archbishop Bustros all hailed from the Middle East, with Bishop Samra being the only American-born bishop.  Bishop Beyrouti was born in Lebanon but raised in Canada.

Clergy Serving in the Episcopacy on Special Assignment Outside the Diocese
 Giorgio Demetrio Gallaro, appointed Bishop of Piana degli Albanesi (Italo-Albanese), Italy in 2015. He was appointed secretary of the Congregation for the Oriental Churches by Pope Francis on 25 February 2020 and given the personal title of archbishop.  He held that position until Pope Francis named his successor on February 2, 2023.

Other notable priests
Rev. Emmanuel Charles McCarthy,Child's Close Call Aided Nun's Way To Sainthood by LAURIE GOODSTEIN Published in The New York Times of October 11, 1998 Advocate for peace and non-violence.  He was ordained by the Melkite patriarch in Damascus since, at the time of his ordination, it was uncustomary to ordain married Melkite clergy outside of the patriarchal lands.  He is not a priest of the Eparchy of Newton but simply resides within it.

 Parish locator 

Religious orders
There is a community of the Basilian Salvatorian Order in Methuen, Massachusetts, with their own regional superior for the U.S. and Canada.  There are currently several Basilian clergy serving in parishes of the eparchy. A community of religious sisters, the Community of the Mother of God of Tenderness'', is based in Danbury, Connecticut.

See also
List of the Catholic bishops of the United States#Other Eastern Catholic bishops

Notes

External links 
 
Annunciation Melkite Catholic Cathedral
Catholic-Hierarchy entry on the Eparchy of Newton
Official site of the Melkite Greek Catholic Patriarchate of Antioch
1966 document founding the Exarchate

Description of the eparchy in gcatholic.org
Sample of Melkite Chant in English, Arabic, and Greek

Melkite Greek Catholic eparchies
Eastern Catholicism in the United States
Eastern Catholicism in Massachusetts
Melkite Greek Catholic Church in the United States
Middle Eastern-American culture in Massachusetts
Newton
Newton
Religious organizations based in Boston
Newton
1966 establishments in the United States